The following tables and graphs show the popularity indexes of Michel Temer presidency. One table and graph show the result of opinion polls made about how the population evaluates the government, and the other ones show the government comparative with the previous one, of former President Dilma Rousseff.

Overall administration evaluation

Comparison with Dilma Rousseff administration

References

Government of Michel Temer
Opinion polling in Brazil